Frederick II, Duke of Saxe-Gotha-Altenburg (28 July 1676 – 23 March 1732), was a duke of Saxe-Gotha-Altenburg.

He was born in Gotha, the fifth child and first son of Frederick I, Duke of Saxe-Gotha-Altenburg and Magdalena Sibylle of Saxe-Weissenfels.

After the death of his father, in 1691, Frederick II assumed the duchy of Saxe-Gotha-Altenburg.

Because he was still under age, a guardianship and co-regency was formed between his uncles, the dukes Bernhard I of Saxe-Meiningen and Heinrich of Saxe-Römhild. In 1693, after he returned from a journey to Holland and England, he wrote to the emperor for a license of adult age and took independent control of the government of his duchy. Frederick was a splendor-loving baroque ruler; maintaining his court and standing army, which he had taken over from his father and even expanded, devoured a considerable amount of his income. As a solution, Frederick hired out his soldiers to foreign princes, which caused him great difficulties in 1702, when the King  Louis XIV of France hired his troops and used them in his war against the Emperor.

Relating to domestic affairs, Frederick essentially continued the policy of his father. He created an orphanage in Altenburg (1715), a workhouse and a lunatic asylum in Kahla (1726), as well as the Magdalenenstift - in honor of his mother and wife (both with the same name) - (1705), an endowment for unmarried noble women. For 100,000 thaler from his private property, he bought the famous numismatic collection of Prince Anton Günther of Schwarzburg Arnstadt, which formed the basis of the current collection of coins (Münzkabinetts) at Schloss Friedenstein.

By accumulation of parts of Saxe-Coburg (dissolved in 1699), Saxe-Eisenberg (dissolved in 1707) and Saxe-Römhild (dissolved in 1710), he succeeded to all, however only at long hereditary disputes under the other Ernestine duchies, which went only to 1735 with an arbitral award of the Emperor finally to end reaching in each case area increases for his country. He died in Altenburg.

Issue
At Friedenstein Castle in Gotha on 7 June 1696, he married his first cousin, Magdalena Augusta of Anhalt-Zerbst.
They had twenty children:
 Sophie (b. Gotha, 30 May 1697 – d. of smallpox, Gotha, 29 November 1703).
 Magdalena (b. Altenburg, 18 July 1698 – d. 13 November 1712).  
 Frederick III, Duke of Saxe-Gotha-Altenburg (b. Gotha, 14 April 1699 – d. Gotha, 10 March 1772).
 Stillborn son (Gotha, 22 April 1700).
 Wilhelm (b. Gotha, 12 March 1701 – d. Gräfentonna, 31 May 1771).
 Karl Frederick (b. Gotha, 20 September 1702 – d. [of smallpox?] Gotha, 21 November 1703).
 Stillborn daughter (b. and d. Gotha, 8 May 1703).
 Johann August (b. Gotha, 17 February 1704 – d. Stadtroda, 8 May 1767).
 Christian (b. Gotha, 27 February 1705 – d. of smallpox, Gotha, 5 March 1705).
 Christian Wilhelm (b. Gotha, 28 May 1706 – d. Stadtroda, 19 July 1748), married on 27 May 1743 to Luise Reuss of Schleiz. Their marriage was childless.
 Ludwig Ernst (b. Gotha, 28 December 1707 – d. Gotha, 13 August 1763)
 Emanuel (b. Gotha, 5 April 1709 – d. Gotha, 10 October 1710).
 Moritz (b. Altenburg, 11 May 1711 – d. Altenburg, 3 September 1777).
 Sophie (b. Altenburg, 23 August 1712 – d. Altenburg, 12 November 1712).
 Karl (b. Gotha, 17 April 1714 – d. Gotha, 10 July 1715).
 Fredericka (b. Gotha, 17 July 1715 – d. Langensalza, 12 May 1775), married on 27 November 1734 to Johann Adolf II, Duke of Saxe-Weissenfels.
 Stillborn son (Gotha, 30 November 1716).
 Magdalena Sibylle (b. Gotha, 15 August 1718 – d. Gotha, 9 November 1718).
 Augusta (b. Gotha, 30 November 1719 – d. Carlton House, 8 February 1772), married on 8 May 1736 to Frederick, Prince of Wales.  They had 9 children, their second child later became King George III of Great Britain.
 Johann Adolf (b. Gotha, 18 May 1721 – d. Friedrichstanneck, 29 April 1799).

Ancestry

References 

 August Beck: Friedrich II., Herzog von Sachsen-Gotha und Altenburg. In: Allgemeine Deutsche Biographie (ADB). Band 8, Duncker & Humblot, Leipzig 1878, S. 3–5.
  Christian Ferdinand Schulze, Leben des Herzogs von Sachsen-Gotha und Altenburg Friedrich II., Digitalisat

1676 births
1732 deaths
House of Saxe-Gotha-Altenburg
People from Saxe-Gotha-Altenburg
People from Gotha (town)
Dukes of Saxe-Gotha-Altenburg